TSS Duke of Argyll was a passenger vessel operated by the London and North Western Railway and the Lancashire and Yorkshire Railway from 1909 to 1923. and also as Alsacien by Angleterre-Lorraine-Alsace from 1927 to 1936.

History

She was built at William Denny and Brothers, as part of a fleet of seven ships delivered by the company between 1892 and 1909. The Duke of Argyll was part of the joint Lancashire & Yorkshire Railway-London & North Western Railway service between Fleetwood and Belfast from 1909 to 1922 when she passed into the hands of the LNWR alone. She passed to the London, Midland & Scottish Railway in 1923. Upon acquisition by Angleterre-Lorraine-Alsace in 1927 she was renamed Alsacien for Tilbury-Dunkirk service. She was scrapped in 1937.

References

1909 ships
Passenger ships of the United Kingdom
Steamships
Ships built on the River Clyde
Ships of the London and North Western Railway
Ships of the Lancashire and Yorkshire Railway
Ships of the London, Midland and Scottish Railway